Bedford Hills is a hamlet and census-designated place (CDP) in the town of Bedford, Westchester County, New York, United States. The population was 3,001 at the 2010 census.  Two New York State prisons for women, Bedford Hills Correctional Facility for Women and Taconic Correctional Facility, are located in the hamlet.

History

When the railroad was built in 1847, Bedford Hills was known as Bedford Station. Bedford Hills extends from a business center at the railroad station to farms and estates, eastward along Harris, Babbitt and Bedford Center roads and south along the Route 117 business corridor up to Mt. Kisco. Bedford Hills is the seat of government of the town of Bedford. The Town House, built in 1927, and Town buildings containing the Police Department and Town offices are located in Bedford Hills.

The Richard H. Mandel House, designed by Edward Durell Stone, was added to the National Register of Historic Places in 1996.

Bedford Hills is the site of Stepping Stones, the historic home of Alcoholics Anonymous co-founder Bill W. and his wife Lois Burnham Wilson, founder of Al-Anon/Alateen. The home, located at 62 Oak Road in Katonah, is on the National Register of Historic Places, and has become a tour destination for members of 12 Step organizations.

The Community House located on Church Street, was originally built in 1919 to serve the needs of returning World War I veterans. Following that time, it was used for potluck suppers, theater productions, and sport activities.

Geography

Demographics

Local media
The Record-Review, a weekly newspaper, reports on local issues in Bedford, Bedford Hills, Katonah, and Pound Ridge. The newspaper began publishing in 1995.

Schools
Bedford Hills Elementary School is a K–5 school which many children in the town attend.
Bedford Hills is one of five schools in the Bedford Central School District where older students attend Fox Lane Middle School and High School.

The Bedford Hills Free Library is located in Bedford Hills and is a member of the Westchester Library System.

Centennial
In May 2010, Bedford Hills celebrated its centennial with a number of community-wide events, including a scavenger hunt and a pie baking contest. This event celebrated the town's name change from Bedford Station to Bedford Hills.

This event was organized with help from the Bedford Hills Historical Museum and its co-presidents, Ellen Cohen and Elin Peterson.

Notable people
Gertrude Berg, actress, screenwriter, producer.
Glenn Close, actress
Michael Douglas and Catherine Zeta-Jones, actors
Kimya Dawson, musician
 Charles Frankel, philosopher
Nan Hayworth, former Congresswoman.
Barnard Hughes, actor
Abbie Ives, professional ice hockey player
Michael J. Knowles, American conservative political commentator
George Soros, billionaire hedge fund investor
Julie Strauss-Gabel, editor of acclaimed young adult literature
Bruce Willis, actor

See also

References

External links 
 All About Bedford: Connecting Our Community With a Click—the most local of news sites on the Town of Bedford, its people and its schools

Hamlets in New York (state)
Census-designated places in New York (state)
Census-designated places in Westchester County, New York
Hamlets in Westchester County, New York
1847 establishments in New York (state)